Rod Keenan (born July 3, 1968, in Great Bend, Kansas) is an American milliner and is the creator of a handcrafted men's headwear collection that is marketed under his label Rod Keenan New York.

Early years and education

Keenan grew up in Great Bend, Kansas; he graduated from the University of Kansas in Lawrence, Kansas, and he attended the Fashion Institute of Technology in New York City and the Parsons School of Design in Paris, France.

Career

Keenan is a famously reclusive New York milliner, who is well known in fashion circles for re-establishing men’s headwear as a fashion commodity in the early 1990s. Keenan is additionally noted for choosing to locate his design studio in the Manhattan neighborhood of Harlem, New York.

Inducted into the Council of Fashion Designers of America (CFDA) in 2006, Keenan has spent the past few years expanding his customer base from celebrities and fashion magazines to broader clientele of fashion consumers.

Inspiration

Drawing on sources that are as divergent as the Dadaists, Elsa Schiaparelli, ancient Egypt, and Kurt Weill, Keenan maintains a characteristic New York vernacular, while he designs in the finest Italian tradition, and executes his work with British millinery precision.

Clientele

In addition to creating hats for celebrities such as Elvis Costello, the Scissor Sisters, Snoop Dogg, Justin Timberlake, and Brad Pitt, among others, Keenan has also designed hats for designers Paul Smith and Dries van Noten. Additionally, Keenan's hat collections can be found in Barneys New York, and Harvey Nichols in London, England.

References

External links
 
 Metropolitan Museum of Art

Living people
American fashion designers
American milliners
Kansas City Art Institute alumni
Fashion Institute of Technology alumni
1968 births
People from Great Bend, Kansas